Eucalyptus nova-anglica, commonly known as the New England peppermint or black peppermint, is a species of small to medium-sized tree endemic to eastern Australia. It has thick, rough, fibrous bark on the trunk and larger branches, lance-shaped adult leaves, flower buds in groups of seven, white flowers and hemispherical or conical fruit.

Description
It has thick, rough, fissured, fibrous bark on the trunk and larger branches. Flowering occurs between February and May and the flowers are white.

Taxonomy and naming
Eucalyptus nova-anglica was first formally described in 1899 by Henry Deane and Joseph Maiden who published the description in Proceedings of the Linnean Society of New South Wales. The specific epithet (nova-anglica) refers to this species' occurrence in the New England area of New South Wales.

Distribution and habitat
New England peppermint grows in woodland and cold, swampy flats between Stanthorpe in far southeastern Queensland to near Nowendoc in New South Wales, mainly within the New England Peppermint Grassy Woodland.

References

nova-anglica
Trees of Australia
Flora of New South Wales
Myrtales of Australia
Flora of Queensland
Plants described in 1899
Taxa named by Joseph Maiden
Taxa named by Henry Deane (engineer)